Franz Bernhard Heinrich Wilhelm Freiherr von Gaudy (19 April 1800 Frankfurt (Oder) – 5 February 1840 Berlin) was a German poet and novelist.

His family came from Scotland. He got his education first in the Collège Français in Berlin, then in Schulpforta. In 1818 he entered the Prussian army, but applied for his discharge in 1833 to pursue the life of a free writer. In 1833 and 1835 he traveled to Italy.

In his poems, he first imitated Heinrich Heine, later Pierre-Jean de Béranger. After Gustav Schwabs retirement he was the editor of the Deutscher Musenalmanach(1839) along with Adelbert von Chamisso.

Works
Erato (1829)
Kaiserlieder (1835)
Aus dem Tagebuch eines wandernden Schneidergesellen (1836)

External links
 
 
 Franz Freiherr von Gaudy: Zum 220. Geburtstag (Kleist Museum, in German)

1800 births
1840 deaths
19th-century German poets
German-language poets
Französisches Gymnasium Berlin alumni
German male poets
19th-century German male writers